The American plaice, American sole or long rough dab (Hippoglossoides platessoides) is a North Atlantic flatfish that belongs, along with other right-eyed flounders, to the family Pleuronectidae. In the northwest Atlantic (H. p. platessoides) it ranges from Greenland and Labrador to Rhode Island, and in the northeast Atlantic (H. p. limandoides) it ranges from Murmansk to the English Channel, Ireland and Iceland.

In the Gulf of Maine spawning peaks in April and May. The species is considered by the Northwest Atlantic Fisheries Organization to be overfished, with no signs of recovery. On the other hand, the Canadian government believes the species is abundant, and counts it as the second most caught flatfish, totalling 50% of the flatfish caught by Canadian fishermen. A 1997 study reports that plaice are endangered in Canada due to overfishing. In its European range, the species is generally common and not actively sought by fishers, but it is often part of the bycatch.

American plaice may be an intermediate host for the nematode parasite Otostrongylus circumlitis, which is a lungworm of seals, primarily affecting animals less than 1 yr of age.

References

American plaice
Fauna of Atlantic Canada
Fauna of the Northeastern United States
Fish of the North Atlantic
Commercial fish
American plaice
Taxa named by Otto Fabricius